The Permanent Representative to the OECD is the senior member of the United Kingdom's delegation to the Organisation for Economic Co-operation and Development (until 1961 called the Organisation for European Economic Co-operation), based in Paris.

The UK Delegation to the OECD is an independent mission, sharing the same building as the bilateral Embassy. 

The Permanent Representative almost always has the personal rank of Ambassador.

Permanent representatives
1948–1952: Sir Edmund Hall-Patch
1952–1960: Sir Hugh Ellis-Rees
1960–1965: Robert Hankey, 2nd Baron Hankey
1965–1968: Sir Edgar Cohen
1968–1971: Sir John Chadwick
1971–1977: Kenna Gallagher
1977–1982: Arthur Maddocks
1982–1985: Kenneth Uffen
1985–1988: Nicholas Bayne
1988–1992: John Gray
1992–1995: Keith MacInnes
1995–1999: Peter Vereker
1999–2003: Christopher Crabbie
2004–2008: David Lyscom
2008–2011: Dominic Martin
2011–2016: Nick Bridge

2016–: Christopher Sharrock

References

External links
The UK Permanent Delegation to the OECD, gov.uk

OECD
United Kingdom